Paula Westher (born 16 April 1965) is a Swedish former cyclist. She competed at the 1984 Summer Olympics and the 1988 Summer Olympics. She won the Nordic Championship in 1989.

Major results
Sources:

1983
 National Junior road Championships
1st  Road race
1st  Time trial
1985
 1st  National Road Race Championships
 6th Overall Tour de l'Aude Cycliste Féminin
1986
 1st  National Road Race Championships
 4th Overall Tour de l'Aude Cycliste Féminin
 9th Overall Postgiro féminin
1987
 6th Overall Postgiro féminin
1988
 3rd National Road Race Championships
 4th Overall Postgiro féminin
 7th (TTT) World championships
1989
 1st Prologue Giro d'Italia Femminile
 2nd National Road Race Championships
 5th Overall Thüringen Ladies Tour
 7th (TTT) World championships
1990
 5th (TTT) World championships
1991
 10th (TTT) World championships

References

External links
 

1965 births
Living people
Swedish female cyclists
Olympic cyclists of Sweden
Cyclists at the 1984 Summer Olympics
Cyclists at the 1988 Summer Olympics
Sportspeople from Malmö